The third season of the American superhero streaming television series Titans premiered on HBO Max on August 12, 2021, and concluded on October 21, 2021, consisting of 13 episodes. It was executive produced by Akiva Goldsman, Geoff Johns, Greg Walker, Greg Berlanti, Sarah Schechter, and Richard Hatem, with Walker serving as showrunner for the third consecutive season. Developed by Goldsman, Johns, and Berlanti, the series is based on the DC Comics team Teen Titans. Brenton Thwaites, Anna Diop, Teagan Croft, Ryan Potter, Conor Leslie, Curran Walters, Joshua Orpin, Minka Kelly, and Alan Ritchson return to the main cast from the previous season, joined by season 2 guest star Damaris Lewis and series newcomers Savannah Welch and Vincent Kartheiser. It is the final season to feature longtime cast members Walters, Leslie, Kelly, and Ritchson (or least the last one to feature them as main cast members), and the only to feature Welch and Kartheiser.

In the third season, the Titans team of Dick Grayson (Thwaites), Kory Anders (Diop), Gar Logan (Potter), Conner (Orpin), Dawn Granger (Kelly), and Hank Hall (Ritchson) travel to Gotham City after learning that their former teammate Jason Todd (Walters) was murdered. Tasked with protecting the city in the absence of Bruce Wayne (Iain Glen), the Titans find themselves targeted by a resurrected Jason, now calling himself Red Hood. Dick, working alongside former vigilante partner and love interest Barbara Gordon (Welch) in her new role as police commissioner, is forced to receive assistance from incarcerated criminal Jonathan Crane (Kartheiser) in stopping Jason. Further tensions emerge when Kory's sister Blackfire (Lewis) takes up residence with the team, despite conflict between her and Kory. Meanwhile, Titan Rachel Roth (Croft) trains with the Amazons in Themyscira as she attempts to resurrect fallen teammate Donna Troy (Leslie).

Titans third season was confirmed shortly before the conclusion of the second season in 2019. Filming was scheduled to begin by the spring of the following year, with the season premiering on DC Universe in late 2020. However, due to the COVID-19 pandemic, production was delayed before the start of filming. Production resumed by October 2020 and concluded by June 2021. The third season was the first to release on HBO Max following its acquisition of DC Universe's original programming and the repurposing of DC Universe into comic distributor DC Universe Infinite. In addition to having elements from Marv Wolfman and George Pérez's 1980s The New Teen Titans and Johns' 2003 Teen Titans comics, the season is inspired by the Batman comic storylines "A Death in the Family" (1988) by Jim Starlin and Jim Aparo, "No Man's Land" (1999) by Jordan B. Gorfinkel, and "Under the Hood" (2004–2006) by Judd Winick and Doug Mahnke.

Reviews of the third season have been positive, with critics regarding it as an improvement over past seasons.

Episodes

Cast and characters

Main 
 Brenton Thwaites as Dick Grayson / Nightwing / Robin
 Viktor Sawchuk and Taj Levey as young Dick Grayson
 Anna Diop as Koriand'r / Kory Anders / Starfire
 Teagan Croft as Rachel Roth / Raven
 Ryan Potter as Gar Logan / Beast Boy
 Conor Leslie as Donna Troy
 Curran Walters as Jason Todd / Robin / Red Hood
 Joshua Orpin as Conner / Superboy
 Damaris Lewis as Komand'r / Blackfire
 Savannah Welch as Barbara Gordon
 Minka Kelly as Dawn Granger / Dove
 Alan Ritchson as Hank Hall / Hawk
 Vincent Kartheiser as Dr. Jonathan Crane

Recurring 

 Iain Glen as Bruce Wayne
 Jay Lycurgo as Tim Drake
 McKinley Freeman as Justin Cole
 Karen Robinson as Margarita Vee
 Eve Harlow as Molly Jensen
 Ryan Allen as Jack Drake
 Chantria Tram as Janet Drake
 Vinson Tran as Stephen Chen

Dog actors Pepsi, Wrigley, and Ziva portray Krypto in the third season.

Guest 

 Wendy Crewson as Valeska Nox
 Paulino Nunes as Sanchez
 Krista Bridges as Dr. Leslie Tompkins
 Dylan Trowbridge as Pete Hawkins
 Kimberly-Sue Murray as Lady Vic
 Raven Dauda as GCPD Administrator
 Tenika Davis as Myrrha
 Elliot Knight as Don Hall / Dove
 Greg Bryk as Fletcher
 Andrew Moodie as King Myand'r
 Dov Tiefenbach as Gizmo
 Rose Napoli as Trina Holmes
 Mal Dassin as Telly Rupp
 Al McFoster as Rafelson Roberts
 Anthony J. Mifsud as Santiago Perez
 Danny Smith as Tod
 Kris Siddiqi as Dr. Artie Kind
 Maxime Savaria as Bivens
 Benjamin Liddell as Michael Nox
 Carlo Rota as the voice of Oracle
 Valerie Buhagiar as Lydia
 Jasmin Geljo as Train Conductor
 Asha James as Queen Luand'r
 Sean Clement as John Grayson

A voice over of poet W. H. Auden is provided by Benedict Campbell. The Joker is portrayed by an uncredited stand-in. Esai Morales and Chella Man appear in archive footage from the second season as Deathstroke and Jericho, while April Brown Chodkowski appears as Mary Grayson in archive footage from the first season.

Production

Development
A few weeks before the second season concluded, Titans was renewed for a third season in November 2019. DC announced that the third season would premiere on DC Universe in the fourth quarter of 2020, with filming scheduled to begin earlier in the year. Before the official start of filming, however, the COVID-19 pandemic in March 2020 forced production to be temporarily shut down. Executive producer Akiva Goldsman stated two months later that filming on the third season had not yet occurred, but would begin "as soon as possible".

During the production delay, DC Chief Creative Officer Jim Lee announced that the series would be moving from DC Universe to HBO Max, which launched in 2020. The third season was the first to premiere on HBO Max.

Writing
Writers Prathi Srinivasan, Joshua Levy, and Stephanie Coggins were reported to have joined the third season in 2020, alongside returning writers Jamie Gorenberg, Tom Pabst, Kate McCarthy, and Richard Hatem.

At DC FanDome in August 2020, showrunner Greg Walker announced that the third season would take place in Gotham City and introduce Red Hood, Jonathan Crane, and Barbara Gordon. It was later revealed that the season intended to use the San Francisco setting of its predecessor, but filming being pushed into the fall and winter months resulted in the story being moved to Gotham. During the extended FanDome panel in September, Walker hinted at Donna Troy returning for season 3, despite the character's death in the previous season.

In 2021, Walker described Gotham as "a huge character" in season 3 that "brings out leadership qualities that [Dick] has to assess to see whether they're his own - true Nightwing - or are they patterns [inherited from] a father who he needs to differentiate himself from?". For Barbara, Walker noted she and Dick would be reckoning with the legacy of James Gordon and Bruce Wayne in the third season. He also compared Crane to Hannibal Lecter as an incarcerated villain who helps the police capture other criminals, while being able to exploit fear.

Casting
Series regulars Brenton Thwaites, Anna Diop, Teagan Croft, Ryan Potter, Conor Leslie, Curran Walters, Joshua Orpin, Alan Ritchson, and Minka Kelly reprise their roles as Dick Grayson, Kory Anders, Rachel Roth, Gar Logan, Donna Troy, Jason Todd, Conner, Hank Hall, and Dawn Granger, alongside Damaris Lewis as Blackfire, who was promoted to series regular status after guest starring in the previous season.

In April 2020, cinematographer Boris Mojsovski revealed that Iain Glen would return as Bruce Wayne for the third season. McKinley Freeman was also revealed to be returning as Justin Cole from the second season. Savannah Welch was announced as Barbara Gordon in January 2021. Later in the month, Jay Lycurgo was revealed to be playing Tim Drake. In April 2021, it was revealed that Vincent Kartheiser had been cast as Dr. Jonathan Crane. Kimberly-Sue Murray was revealed to be portraying Lady Vic in May 2021.

The third season is the last to feature Ritchson, who officially departed after the episode "Souls", and currently the last to feature Walters, Leslie, and Kelly.

Filming 
After being delayed by the COVID-19 pandemic, filming began on October 13, 2020, and concluded on June 15, 2021.

Shortly after the season premiere, Kartheiser was allegedly investigated twice over accusations of disruptive behavior and inappropriate comments on set. Kartheiser denied the allegations.

Release 
The third season premiered in the United States through HBO Max on August 12, 2021, and concluded on October 21, 2021. The first three episodes aired on the premiere date, while the remaining episodes were released weekly.

Reception
Reception to the third season has been positive. On Rotten Tomatoes, the season holds a 100% approval rating based on 20 reviews, with an average rating of 8.2 out of 10. Its critical consensus reads, "With bolder storytelling and deeper characterization, Titans third season hits the show's sweet spot to deliver the best season yet."

Notes

References

External links 
 
 

Titans (2018 TV series) seasons
2021 American television seasons
Television productions postponed due to the COVID-19 pandemic